Johnny Duffy (born in Killawalla, County Mayo, Ireland) plays club football for Ballintubber.
He came on as a substitute against Crossmolina in the Mayo County Senior Semi Finals 2012 in McHale park and won the game for Ballintubber with a superbly taken goal, and all-around great individual performance.

References

External links
Ballintubber GAA Results 2012
Ballintubber to defend their title against Ballagh'

Living people
Ballintubber Gaelic footballers
Year of birth missing (living people)
Gaelic games players from County Mayo